Chipps Chippendale (real name William Henry James Chippendale III) is a mountain biking journalist in the UK. After working  as a bicycle messenger, his journalistic career started in 1994 with the UK magazine MTB Pro, on which he worked for five years. After the magazine was closed down by its publishers, Future Publishing, who said that there was not enough interest in a magazine about the 'soul' of mountain biking, he left the company and went freelance, contributing to Mountain Biking UK, Total Bike, Maximum Mountain Bike and others. He also wrote for Clarks Originals, for whom he wrote a book about 50 years of the (Clarks) Desert Boot.

In early 2000, he started working for 9feet.com, a startup website based on the 'online shop with editorial content' model, specialising in outdoor gear. He worked there for nearly a year until meeting Mark Alker and Shaun Murray, then of www.gofar-mtb.com, a privately run mountain bike website. They suggested he join them and start making a print magazine. The three of them created Singletrack in 2001 with Chippendale as founding editor. He is still the editor and regularly writes and photographs for it.

Chippendale is generally credited with popularising singlespeed mountain biking in the UK - an idea he claims to have stolen from Bike magazine's editor Mike Ferrentino - and is a collaborator in The Outcast, an underground singlespeed fanzine. He organised the UK's first Singlespeed National Championships in 1995 (Stow on the Wold) and subsequent ones in 1996, 1997, 1998, 1999 and 2001 (all in Cheddar, Somerset), culminating in organising the Singlespeed World Championships in Afan Argoed in 2001. He is also the organiser of the Todmorden cyclocross race, held every year since 2009 and based on a well-established event that used to take place in the town.

Chipps moved to Todmorden in late 2001, coinciding with Singletrack getting its first office. He has been a resident ever since and now calls it home, despite his southern upbringing.

Chippendale was awarded the Cycling Media Legend award at the 2015 Cycling Media Awards.

References

External links
 Dirt Rag interview with Chipps Chippendale

British sportswriters
Mountain biking journalists
Living people
Year of birth missing (living people)